William Anton "Moose" Fischer (March 10, 1927 – January 20, 2017) was an American football lineman who played professionally in the National Football League (NFL) for the Chicago Cardinals, from 1949 to 1953. He was a first-round pick by the Chicago Cardinals in the 1949 NFL Draft. With the Cardinals, he was invited to three Pro Bowls. He played college football at the University of Notre Dame, where he won two national championships, was twice named a consensus All-American in 1947 and 1948, and was awarded the Outland Trophy as the nation's top lineman in 1948. He was the first Mr. Irrelevant to make the Pro Bowl, who was the last pick in the 1948 NFL Draft. He was drafted by the Chicago Cardinals after his junior season at Notre Dame.  He opted to stay in school, and won the Outland Trophy as the nation's top interior lineman in 1948.  The Cardinals drafted him again in 1949, this time with their first round pick.

Fischer returned to Notre Dame after his playing career, serving as an assistant coach under Terry Brennan, from 1954 to 1958. He also served as president of the Notre Dame Monogram Club in 1982. In 1983, he was inducted into the National Football Foundation Hall of Fame. Fischer died on  January 20, 2017, in Cape Coral, Florida.

References

External links
 
 
 

1927 births
2017 deaths
American football defensive tackles
American football guards
American football tackles
Chicago Cardinals players
Eastern Conference Pro Bowl players
National Football League announcers
Notre Dame Fighting Irish football coaches
Notre Dame Fighting Irish football players
St. Louis Cardinals (football) announcers
All-American college football players
College Football Hall of Fame inductees
Sportspeople from Chicago
Players of American football from Chicago